Gérard Castella (born 2 May 1953) is a retired Swiss football midfielder and later manager.

References

1953 births
Living people
Swiss men's footballers
Yverdon-Sport FC players
FC Lausanne-Sport players
Neuchâtel Xamax FCS players
Grasshopper Club Zürich players
Grazer AK players
U.S. Sassuolo Calcio players
FC Wil players
FC Sion players
Association football midfielders
Swiss Super League players
Swiss expatriate footballers
Expatriate footballers in Austria
Swiss expatriate sportspeople in Austria
Expatriate footballers in Italy
Swiss expatriate sportspeople in Italy
Austrian Football Bundesliga players
Swiss football managers
Étoile Carouge FC managers
FC Lausanne-Sport managers
Urania Genève Sport managers